Clevo is a Taiwanese OEM/ODM computer manufacturer which produces laptop computers exclusively. They sell barebone laptops chassis (barebooks) to value-added resellers who build customized laptops for individual customers.

History
Clevo was founded in 1983 as Nan Tan Computer (NTC). In 1987, the company established its laptop computer business, with production starting in 1990. In 1992, NTC set up Clevo, a U.S. subsidiary which would distribute its laptops in the country. NTC later adopted the Clevo name for itself and first listed on the Taiwan Stock Exchange in 1997. In 1999, Clevo merged with their subsidiary, Kapok, to increase efficiency. In August 2002, Clevo had built a new factory in Kunshan, China.

Background
Clevo has been ranked as fourth among Taiwanese exporters, marketing its products in over 50 countries. The company has also founded several service centers in Canada, Germany, Great Britain, China, Taiwan, South Korea and the United States. These centers serve various businesses, ranging in size from small to multinational, with a variety of product selections in either small or large quantities. Clevo focuses its business on designing, developing, manufacturing, and distributing electronic equipment and laptops.

Support
One distinctive feature that Clevo PCs adopt is the use of MXM upgradable video cards and replaceable desktop CPUs in some of its laptops.

Customers
Clevo does not sell directly to end users. Their products are all sold to their customers (resellers, distributors, computer builders), who then own-brand and/or configure them based on end user preferences.

Table 
Companies that use Clevo include:

See also
 List of companies of Taiwan
 Clevo x7200

References 

Computer hardware companies
Companies established in 1983
Taiwanese companies established in 1983
Taiwanese brands

Computer companies established in 1983
Consumer electronics brands
Netbook manufacturers